Alice Wolfson is an American activist. A Barnard College graduate and former Fulbright Scholar, she is a veteran political activist in women's reproductive health issues, a lawyer, and a co-founder of the National Women's Health Network.

She played an important role at the Nelson Pill Hearings on Capitol Hill, where she and other soon-to-be prominent health feminists were galvanized by their success at warning women of the Pill's dangerous side effects.

In 1968, she signed the “Writers and Editors War Tax Protest” pledge, vowing to refuse tax payments in protest against the Vietnam War.

She worked in the 1990s to obtain damages for women adversely affected by breast implants.

She is featured in the feminist history film She's Beautiful When She's Angry.

Today, Wolfson is an attorney who specializes in women's health care. Wolfson is concerned about new methods of hormonal contraception and advocates use of barrier methods over oral or injectable contraceptives. She believes that "it is criminal to suggest anything other than condoms."

References

Sources 
 Amy Bloom, "Alice Wolfson Still Speaking Out", National Women's Health Network Newsletter, Jan/Feb 1995 

Year of birth missing (living people)
Living people
American women lawyers
American health activists
American lawyers
American tax resisters
American women's rights activists
Barnard College alumni
Women's health movement
21st-century American women